Errol John Harris (born 2 May 1963) is an Australian former cricketer. He played first-class cricket for Tasmania and List A cricket for both Tasmania and Queensland.

See also
 List of Tasmanian representative cricketers

References

External links
 

1963 births
Living people
Australian cricketers
Queensland cricketers
Tasmania cricketers
Sportspeople from Cairns

Australian cricket coaches